Jelena Dubljević (born May 7, 1987) is a Montenegrin professional basketball player for Botaş SK. She is also part of the Montenegrin national team. She competed in the 2011 Eurobasket tournament with Montenegro. In 2016, Dubljević signed with the Los Angeles Sparks. In her first WNBA season, she won her first WNBA championship with the Sparks after they defeated the Minnesota Lynx 3–2 in the Finals.

References

External links
 FIBA Europe
Profile at eurobasket.com

1987 births
Living people
Galatasaray S.K. (women's basketball) players
Los Angeles Sparks players
Montenegrin expatriate basketball people in Turkey
Montenegrin expatriate basketball people in the United States
Montenegrin women's basketball players
Power forwards (basketball)
Shanghai Swordfish players
Sportspeople from Nikšić
Tarbes Gespe Bigorre players
Undrafted Women's National Basketball Association players